Gonet is a surname, and may refer to:

 Jean Baptiste Gonet (c. 1616 – 1681), French Dominican theologian
 Stella Gonet (born 1963), Scottish theatre, film and TV actress

Other uses
 GOnet, a system for physicians in Ontario, Canada, to send their medical billing to OHIP via dial-up modem